Parambassis siamensis is a species of freshwater fish in the Asiatic glassfish family Ambassidae. It is native to the mainland Southeast Asia in Thailand, Cambodia, Vietnam, and Laos; records from Singapore and Java (Indonesia) probably are introductions. Its range includes the Mekong, Mae Klong, and Chao Phraya basins.

References

siamensis
Fish of the Mekong Basin
Fish of Cambodia
Fish of Laos
Fish of Thailand
Fish of Vietnam
Fish described in 1937
Taxa named by Henry Weed Fowler